Turris venusta, common name the comely pleurotoma, is a species of sea snail, a marine gastropod mollusk in the family Turridae, the turrids.

Description
The length of the shell varies between 49 mm and 109 mm.

(Original description) The shell has a stoutly fusiform shape. It is yellowish and spotted with dark brown. The whorls are rounded and transversely many-ribbed, obliquely spotted. The upper part is depressed, vividly painted with larger spots . The siphonal canal  is long.

Distribution
This marine species occurs off the Philippines.

References

External links
 Kilburn R.N., Fedosov A.E. & Olivera B.M. (2012) Revision of the genus Turris Batsch, 1789 (Gastropoda: Conoidea: Turridae) with the description of six new species. Zootaxa 3244: 1-58
 Biolib;cz : Turris venusta

venusta
Gastropods described in 1843